James Bukomeko (born 1968)  is an Anglican bishop who serves in Uganda: he is the fifth Bishop of Mukono since 2010.

Bukomeko was born on 1 November, 1968 in Luweero and educated at Uganda Christian University. He was ordained in 1996. He has served at Kireka, Namasuba, Kansanga, Namirembe, Maganjo and Nansana.

References

21st-century Anglican bishops in Uganda
Anglican bishops of Mityana
People from Luweero District
Uganda Christian University alumni
1968 births
Living people